Locunolé is a commune in the Finistère department of Brittany in north-western France.

Toponymy
From the Breton loc which means hermitage  and 'unolé' which derive from Saint Guénolé.

Geography

The river Ellé forms the eastern border of the commune.

Neighbouring communes
Locunolé is border by Guilligomarc'h to east, by Arzano to south, by Tréméven to west and by Querrien to north.

Population
Inhabitants of Locunolé are called in French Locunolois.

Map

Gallery

See also
Communes of the Finistère department
Entry on sculptor of local war memorial Jean Joncourt

References

External links

Mayors of Finistère Association 

Communes of Finistère